Marija Shteriova (born 19 March 1991), is a Macedonian handball player who plays for Gloria Buzău and the Macedonian national team.

International honours 
EHF Champions League: 
Bronze Medalist: 2014

References

1991 births
Living people
Sportspeople from Skopje
Macedonian female handball players
Expatriate handball players
Macedonian expatriate sportspeople in Hungary
Macedonian expatriate sportspeople in Norway
Macedonian expatriate sportspeople in Turkey
Macedonian expatriate sportspeople in Romania
CS Minaur Baia Mare (women's handball) players